Caesarstone Ltd., or Caesarstone (Even Qeysar), is a publicly traded company that engages in the production and marketing of quartz surfaces used for kitchen countertops, vanity tops, flooring, wall cladding and general interior design. The company was founded in 1987 and is traded on the NASDAQ in New York (CSTE). Headquarters are located in Kibbutz Sdot Yam in Israel, and its production facilities are in Israel and the USA.  Its products are sold in approximately 50 countries around the world through a network of 6 subsidiaries and numerous distributors.

Company profile

Caesarstone Ltd. manufactures quartz surfaces in three different sites, two in Israel – Kibbutz Sdot Yam and the Bar Lev Industrial Zone near Karmiel, and in its new plant in Richmond Hill, GA, USA, since May 27, 2015. Caesarstone also has established warehouses and refinery plants in Shanghai, Beijing, Shenzhen, and Hong Kong. Its products, which are sold in over 50 countries around the world, are used in the interior design of both residential and commercial buildings. Common uses of Caesarstone's products include quartz surfaces for kitchen countertops, vanity tops, wall-cladding, flooring and interior design of commercial spaces such as offices, restaurants, hotels, museums, and more. Caesarstone's main competitors are companies that make use of materials such as lamination and natural stone, and other companies that manufacture quartz surfaces such as Superior Zodiaq, Silestone and Cambria. The name Caesarstone comes from the company's location near Caesarea.

History

The Caesarstone factory commenced its operations in 1987, at Kibbutz Sdot Yam, replacing its terrazzo tile factory. The company was established in the wake of development work performed jointly by members of the kibbutz and additional parties such as Professor Moshe Narkis of the Technion. After changing the focus from sale of floor tiles to quartz surfaces and establishing itself in the domestic market, the company started to export its products to different countries around the world. In 2005, an additional production facility was opened at the Bar-Lev Industrial Park. In 2006, TENE Investment Fund invested 25 million dollars in exchange for 21.7% control in the company, which led to the adding of another production line at the Bar-Lev facility.

In 2008, the company began establishing subsidiaries in its main markets: Australia (2008), Canada (2010), USA and Singapore (2011) and UK (2017) along with activity conducted through distributors in approximately 50 countries.

In 2012, Caesarstone started trading on NASDAQ in New York under the ticker symbol CSTE.

In 2015, Caesarstone opened a new facility in the US with an investment of about 100 million dollars. The plant was built in Richmond Hill, Georgia, and provides quartz surfaces mainly to markets in North America, and other countries as well.

Products 
The company's products are marketed in four collections:
 Classico – the classic collection in a variety of colors.
 Supernatural – design inspired by natural stone.
 Motivo – surfaces with imprinted textures in various design templates.
 Concetto – surfaces made from semi-precious gems cut and set manually.
Quartz surfaces are claimed to require only minimum maintenance and not to require periodic sealing as with natural stone surfaces.

In the US, quartz counter tops can be found in homes and kitchens such as Tommy Hilfiger, Cher, Alexandra von Furstenberg, and more.

Due to the high crystalline silica in the dust created when working with engineered stone exposure can result in severe health risks.

Financial 
Caesarstone's operations are impacted by the performance of the home remodeling and new construction sectors of the economy.

In 2016, the global quartz surface industry constituted about 6% of to the total global surfaces industry, valued at about 95 billion dollars. In 2016, Caesarstone's share in the quartz surface market (in its leading markets) was: Israel 84%; Australia 55%; Canada 36%; USA 19%.

In 2016, Caesarstone registered a revenue of 539 million dollars, 1.7% higher than the forecast. The net profit stood at 2.15 dollars per share as opposed to 2.12 dollars per share. For 2017, Caesarstone expects that revenue will stand at 580-595 million dollars and EBITDA in the range of 119-126 million dollars.

2012 Nasdaq IPO

In February 2012, Caesarstone filed with the U.S. Securities and Exchange Commission to execute an initial public offering of up to $115 million and list its shares on the Nasdaq stock exchange. Among the companies involved in the IPO were J.P. Morgan, Barclays, Credit Suisse, and Baird. Caesarstone's 6.7 million shares began trading on the NASDAQ Global Select Market on 22 March and priced at $11 each.

In 2015-2016, Caesarstone encountered challenges which included discord between shareholders and kibbutz members, departure of board members and CEO, and a report by Spruce Point hedge fund claiming that the company's quartz surfaces contain less than the commonly accepted amounts of quartz, and yet are still sold at premium prices. In 2016 the share price declined compared to its former peak, however in H1 2017, Caesarstone shares climbed 23 percent; thus, Caesarstone's value stands at 1.49 billion dollars.

See also
Economy of Israel
Home improvement
List of Israeli companies

References

External links 

Manufacturing companies established in 1987
Manufacturing companies of Israel
Companies listed on the Nasdaq
2012 initial public offerings